Igor Kozioł (born January 2, 1976 in Wadowice) is a Polish former footballer who played as a midfielder or defender.

External links
 

Polish footballers
Lechia Gdańsk players
Polonia Warsaw players
1976 births
Living people
People from Wadowice
Hutnik Warsaw players
Sportspeople from Lesser Poland Voivodeship

Association footballers not categorized by position